Calliostoma bullisi, common name Bullis's top shell, is a species of sea snail, a marine gastropod mollusk in the family Calliostomatidae.

Description
The shell grows to a height of 35 mm.

Distribution
This species occurs in the Atlantic Ocean off East Brazil at depths between 28 m and 73 m; in the Caribbean Ocean off Isla Margarita, Venezuela.

References

bullisi
Molluscs of the Atlantic Ocean
Gastropods described in 1960
Taxa named by William J. Clench